"Roamin' Thru' the Gloamin' with 40,000 Headmen" (album title: "Forty Thousand Headmen"), written by Steve Winwood and Jim Capaldi, was first recorded by Traffic in 1967 or 1968. It was initially released as B-side to the "No Face, No Name and No Number" single in 1968 and also appears on their second album Traffic. Blood, Sweat & Tears also recorded it on their 1970 album, Blood, Sweat & Tears 3.

The protagonist of the song, a profane demi-god, follows the eponymous headmen across the sea, on foot, to a hidden cave where they have stored up a large treasure. Taking as much as he can carry, he travels to a shrine only to find that the headmen have followed him; they open fire, wounding the protagonist but not killing him, and he decides to flee. The dream-like story seems to start and end with his confrontation with the headmen, as if he's experiencing his life in a closed loop. The lyrics were inspired by what Capaldi refers to as "a hash-fueled dream." He also described them as "a loon". They have been described as being "an evocation of a dream state".

Dave Mason and Jim Capaldi's 1998-99 "40,000 Headmen" reunion tour took its name from this song, despite the fact that Mason had no involvement in the original recording of the song. An album of highlights from this tour has been released..

Jim Capaldi's 2011 box set, Dear Mr Fantasy, includes a reggae version of the song. The song also appears as the third song on the first side of the live album "Welcome to the Canteen" which features Winwood and Capaldi.

The Chicago band "40,000 Headmen", who play the music of Traffic, Blind Faith and Spencer Davis Group, get their name from this song.

The Blood, Sweat and Tears version begins and ends with a music box playing Bela Bartok's Hungarian Folk Song.

Personnel
Steve Winwood – vocals, guitar, organ, bass guitar
Chris Wood – flute, Coke tin, sleigh bells
Jim Capaldi – drums

References

External links

1968 songs
Songs written by Steve Winwood
Songs written by Jim Capaldi
Traffic (band) songs
Song recordings produced by Jimmy Miller